Operation Silver  may refer to:

Operation Silver (1949), wire-tapping into the landline communications of the Soviet Army headquarters in Vienna
Operation Silver (2007), a British led operation against Taliban forces in Helmand province in Afghanistan in 2007